Oildale is a census-designated place (CDP) in Kern County, California, United States. The population was 32,684 at the 2010 census, up from 27,885 at the 2000 census. It is an unincorporated suburban town just north of Bakersfield across the Kern River, west of the Kern River Oil Field, and east of Highway 99.

History

Previously called Waits and North Side, Oildale was founded in 1909 when Samuel Dickinson subdivided his land. The first post office opened at Oildale in 1916. Most of the original U-2 spy planes flown out of Groom Lake were built at a secret factory in Oildale disguised as a tire factory, just west of Meadows Field Airport on Norris Road.

Geography

Oildale is adjacent to three large oil fields, including two of the largest in California.  The enormous Kern River Oil Field to the east and northeast has more active oil wells (9,183 at the end of 2006) than any other field in California except for the Midway-Sunset Oil Field in southwestern Kern County (which has 11,145).  Also adjacent is the huge Kern Front Oil Field, north of town, and the smaller Fruitvale Oil Field, to the southwest.

Demographics

2010
At the 2010 census Oildale had a population of 32,684. The racial makeup of Oildale was 27,463 (84.0%) White, 255 (0.8%) African American, 590 (1.8%) Native American, 316 (1.0%) Asian, 30 (0.1%) Pacific Islander, 2,635 (8.1%) from other races, and 1,395 (4.3%) from two or more races. Hispanic or Latino of any race were 6,301 persons (19.3%).

The census reported that 32,636 people (99.9% of the population) lived in households, 48 (0.1%) lived in non-institutionalized group quarters, and no one was institutionalized.

There were 12,023 households, 4,775 (39.7%) had children under the age of 18 living in them, 4,476 (37.2%) were opposite-sex married couples living together, 2,372 (19.7%) had a female householder with no husband present, 1,078 (9.0%) had a male householder with no wife present.  There were 1,322 (11.0%) unmarried opposite-sex partnerships, and 132 (1.1%) same-sex married couples or partnerships. 3,099 households (25.8%) were one person and 1,062 (8.8%) had someone living alone who was 65 or older. The average household size was 2.71.  There were 7,926 families (65.9% of households); the average family size was 3.23.

The age distribution was 9,426 people (28.8%) under the age of 18, 3,627 people (11.1%) aged 18 to 24, 8,810 people (27.0%) aged 25 to 44, 7,561 people (23.1%) aged 45 to 64, and 3,260 people (10.0%) who were 65 or older.  The median age was 31.4 years. For every 100 females, there were 94.9 males.  For every 100 females age 18 and over, there were 91.9 males.

There were 13,555 housing units at an average density of 2,075.0 per square mile, of the occupied units 5,211 (43.3%) were owner-occupied and 6,812 (56.7%) were rented. The homeowner vacancy rate was 4.0%; the rental vacancy rate was 10.5%.  13,576 people (41.5% of the population) lived in owner-occupied housing units and 19,060 people (58.3%) lived in rental housing units.

2000
According to the census of 2000, there were 27,885 people, 10,983 households, and 7,084 families in the CDP. The racial makeup of the CDP was 88.99% White, 0.34% Black or African American, 2.19% Native American, 0.33% Asian, 0.06% Pacific Islander, 4.79% from other races, and 3.29% from two or more races.  10.14% of the population were Hispanic or Latino of any race.

Of the 10,983 households 34.0% had children under the age of 18 living with them, 40.1% were married couples living together, 17.7% had a female householder with no husband present, and 35.5% were non-families. 28.9% of households were one person and 11.1% were one person aged 65 or older.  The average household size was 2.53 and the average family size was 3.11.

The age distribution was 29.5% under the age of 18, 10.1% from 18 to 24, 28.8% from 25 to 44, 19.6% from 45 to 64, and 12.0% 65 or older.  The median age was 33 years. For every 100 females, there were 91.5 males.  For every 100 females age 18 and over, there were 86.7 males.

The median household income was $27,041 and the median family income  was $32,397. Males had a median income of $31,514 versus $21,715 for females. The per capita income for the CDP was $13,342.  About 17.2% of families and 20.9% of the population were below the poverty line, including 27.1% of those under age 18 and 9.6% of those age 65 or over.

Notable people
Vern Burke - Pro football player
Merle Haggard - Country music artist
Kevin Harvick - NASCAR driver
Gerald Haslam - Author
Buck Owens - Country music artist

References

External links

Census-designated places in Kern County, California
Populated places established in 1909
1909 establishments in California
Census-designated places in California